A total lunar eclipse will take place on October 19, 2051. The northern limb of the moon will pass through the center of the Earth's shadow.

This will be the first central eclipse of Saros series 137 and the fourth and final lunar eclipse in the 2050-2051 tetrad.

Less than a day from perigee, the Moon's apparent diameter will be larger, and be considered a supermoon.

Visibility 

It will be completely visible over Central Asia, and Africa, seen rising over Western Africa, and South America, and setting over Australia.

Related lunar eclipses

Lunar year series

Saros series

It is part of Saros series 137.

See also 
List of lunar eclipses and List of 21st-century lunar eclipses

Notes

External links 
 

2051-10
2051-10
2051-10
2051 in science